Miyakea ussurica is a moth in the family Crambidae. It was described by Petr Ya. Ustjuzhanin and Rob T.A. Schouten in 1995. It is found in the Russian Far East.

References

Crambini
Moths described in 1995
Moths of Asia